Capitaine Georges Marcel Lachmann was a French World War I flying ace. He was credited with nine confirmed aerial victories.

World War I
On 21 July 1914, Georges Marcel Lachman was awarded the civil pilot's license he had earned. On 2 August 1914, as France began World War I, Sergeant Lachmann reported to duty with the 2eme Group d'Aviation and received Military Pilot's Brevet No. 499. He would be one of the rare aces who began and ended World War I with aviation, and he served on all major fronts of the war.

He was first assigned to Escadrille 27; it was while he was with them he flew his first war mission, on 31 August. In January 1915, he was transferred to Escadrille 15, which was also operating Robert Esnault-Pelterie K-80 airplanes. On 8 March 1915, he was promoted to Adjutant. A month later, he was retrained on different airplanes. On 26 May 1915, he continued his peripatetic career by being posted to Escadrille 57 on the Western Front in France. On 31 July 1915, he was commissioned as a Sous lieutenant. On 13 August 1915, he was transferred to Escadrille 92 on the Italian Front. At first, he was only one of three pilots and three observers assigned to fly Nieuport 10s in defense of Venice, though later Escadrille 92 gained three more pilots. He was a major participant in the hour's air combat of 15 October 1915 that discouraged further Austro-Hungarian raids on the city.

On 24 March 1916, he returned to the Western Front and Escadrille 57. On 15 July 1916, Lachmann scored his first aerial victory, using a Nieuport to destroy an enemy observation balloon over Ham. On 28 July, he teamed with Georges Flachaire and Jean Matton to share in a win over an Albatros two-seater observation plane. On 12 August 1916, Lachmann downed another foe.

Georges Marcel Lachmann was inducted into the Légion d'honneur on 6 January 1917. On 21 March 1917, Lachmann was posted to the Russian Front to serve in Escadrille 581 as a Spad pilot. He was wounded in action on 26 June 1917. On 8 July 1917, he assumed command of the squadron. During September and October 1917, he scored six victories, three over enemy airplanes and three as a balloon buster. On 24 December 1917, he was promoted to Lieutenant.

On 7 January 1918, Lachmann's command expanded to include a second squadron, Escadrille 406. In February 1918, he was withdrawn from Russia. In April, he was posted as an advisor to the military attaché in Leghorn, Italy. In August, he returned to Russia; in November, he was back in France.<ref> Note: Award of the Croix de guerre was a prerequisite for receiving the "Légion d'honneur.</ref>

Post World War I
Lachmann went to Africa, and spent some time surveying landing fields.

He died at Tonnerre on 12 August 1961.

Honours and awards
Légion d'honneur
Médaille militaire
Croix de Guerre with ten palmes
Croce di Guerra (Italy)
Knight of the Order of the Crown of Italy
Knight of the Order of Saint George 4th Class (Russia) (31.10.1917)

References
 Over the Front: A Complete Record of the Fighter Aces and Units of the United States and French Air Services, 1914-1918'' Norman L. R. Franks, Frank W. Bailey. Grub Street, 1992. , .

External links
 http://www.theaerodrome.com/aces/france/lachmann.php lists his victories
 http://www.microsofttranslator.com/bv.aspx?ref=SERP&br=ro&mkt=en-US&dl=en&lp=FR_EN&a=http%3a%2f%2falbindenis.free.fr%2fSite_escadrille%2fescadrille004.htm has an excellent photo of Lachmann three-quarters of the way down the "page"

Endnotes

Bibliography

1890 births
1961 deaths
French military officers
French World War I flying aces
Recipients of the Croix de Guerre 1914–1918 (France)
Recipients of the Legion of Honour
Recipients of the War Cross for Military Valor